Independence Stadium may also refer to:

 Independence Stadium (Bakau) in Gambia
 Independence Stadium (Namibia) in Windhoek
 Independence Stadium (South Africa) in Mthatha, a football stadium in South Africa
 Independence Stadium (Tanzania) in Dar es Salaam
 Independence Stadium (Shreveport) in Louisiana, US
 Independence Stadium (Zambia) in Lusaka
 Stadium Merdeka (Independence Stadium) in Malaysia